Berwyn originally referred to the Berwyn range of mountains in northeast Wales:

Berwyn may also refer to:

Places

United States
Berwyn, Illinois, a city
Berwyn, Nebraska, a village
Berwyn, Oklahoma, the former name of Gene Autry, Oklahoma
Berwyn, Pennsylvania, a census-designated place
Berwyn Township (disambiguation), multiple places

Elsewhere
Berwyn, Alberta, Canada, a village
Berwyn, Denbighshire, Wales, a settlement

People
Berwyn Jones (1940–2007), Welsh sprinter and rugby union and rugby league player
Berwyn Price (born 1951), Welsh former hurdler
Richard Jones Berwyn (1837–1917), early Welsh colonist in Patagonia
Berwyn (musician), London-based rapper, songwriter and producer Berwyn Du Bois

Other uses
 Berwyn station (disambiguation), stations of the name
 HM Prison Berwyn, Wrexham, Wales
  (1918–1920), a United States Navy cargo ship

See also
Cadair Berwyn, a mountain summit in north east Wales
Cadair Berwyn North Top or Cadair Berwyn (Old Top), a top of Cadair Berwyn in north east Wales